The Island Monster (Italian: Il mostro dell'isola/ The Monster of the Island) is a 1954 Italian thriller film directed by Roberto Bianchi Montero and starring Boris Karloff, Franca Marzi and Germana Paolieri. It was made at Cinecitta Studios with location shooting taking place on the island of Ischia.

Plot 
Don Gaetano, an apparently respectable man but the leader of a gang of traffickers, kidnaps a little girl to force a policeman not to investigate; the latter, aided by a woman of the gang, frees the child and arrests the criminals.

Cast 
Boris Karloff as Don Gaetano 
 Franca Marzi as Gloria D'Auro 
 Renato Vicario as Ten. Mario Andreani 
 Patrizia Remiddi as Fiorella Andreani 
 Jole Fierro as Giulia 
 Carlo Duse as Foster 
 Germana Paolieri as Adalgisa 
 Giuseppe Chinnici as Maresciallo Antonio Carcani 
 Giulio Battiferri as Il rapitore 
 Domenico De Nimmo as Uomo di Pozzuoli 
 Clara Gamberini as La contessa 
 Salvatore Scibetta as Col. Della Finanza

References

Bibliography
 Barry Atkinson. Atomic Age Cinema: The Offbeat, the Classic and the Obscure. Midnight Marquee, 2013.
 Lawrence McCallum. Italian Horror Films of the 1960s: A Critical Catalog of 62 Chillers. McFarland & Company, 1998.

External links

1954 films
1950s thriller films
Italian thriller films
Films directed by Roberto Bianchi Montero
Films set in the Mediterranean Sea
1950s Italian-language films
Films shot at Cinecittà Studios
Italian black-and-white films
1950s Italian films